Namyang Seo clan is one of the Korean clans. Their Bon-gwan is in Suwon, Gyeonggi Province. According to the research held in 2000, the number of the Namyang Seo clan was 2246. Their founder was  who was naturalized from China during Goryeo period.  was dispatched Goryeo as one of Hanlin Academy, and got two positions named "grandmaster" (태사님 TaeSaNim 太師님) and Count of Namyang. His descendant officially began Namyang Hong clan, and designated Bon-gwan as Namyang.

See also 
 Korean clan names of foreign origin

References

External links 
 

 
Korean clan names of Chinese origin
Seo clans